Ursel Air Base  is a joint public/military airport located 10.2 km southwest of Eeklo near Ursel, East Flanders, Belgium.

History
The airfield was established in the summer 1939 for the Belgian Air Force. On 11 May 1940, Belgian Air Force moved here Fairey Foxes and Renard R16s for attacking the German invaders. Five days later the airfield was bombed the first time by Germans, that occupied the badly damaged base on 27 May. After the Battle of Belgium was over, it was taken over by the Luftwaffe and used as an airfield during the occupation period. In July 1940, the runway was re-laid in concrete and hangars and operational buildings restored. In autumn 1940, Germans assigned the airfield to the Corpo Aereo Italiano, the air corps sent by Regia Aeronautica for operations against Britain. Ursel was the base of 18° Gruppo, equipped with 50 Fiat CR.42 fighters, that arrived on 19 October. 
Italian occupation created a diplomatic break between Italy and the Belgian government in exile which led to a Belgian offensive against Italian East Africa.

The area was liberated by British Army forces in September 1944, and Royal Engineers converted the airfield to Royal Air Force use, designating the field as Advanced Landing Ground B-67. Four squadrons of Hawker Typhoon fighter-bombers operated from the field, their mission being to break the resistance of German troops at the Dutch island of Walcheren, which controlled the entrance to the harbours of Antwerp. Once the entrance to Antwerp was cleared, the RAF moved out and the airfield was abandoned.

Ursel was used during Exercise Reforger 76 in August/September of that year for the re-assembly of United States-based US Army helicopters arriving by ship into Zeebrugge for onward deployment to Kitzingen, Germany.

Ursel remains a reserve base for the Belgian Air Component. It is available for civilian recreational use during weekends, and hosts two aeroclubs.

Bibliography
 Haining, Peter The Chianti Raiders The Extraordinary Story of the Italian Air Force in the Battle of Britain London Robson 2005

See also
List of airports in Belgium

References 

 Ursel - ALG B.67
 Johnson, David C. (1988), U.S. Army Air Forces Continental Airfields (ETO), D-Day to V-E Day; Research Division, USAF Historical Research Center, Maxwell AFB, Alabama.

External links 
 Ursel Flying Club
 Airport record for Ursel Air Base at Landings.com

Belgian airbases
Airports in East Flanders
World War II airfields in Belgium
Airports established in 1935